Geovanny Patricio Cumbicus Castillo (born 25 January 1980) is an Ecuadorian football manager and former player who played as a central defender. He is the current manager of Mushuc Runa.

Playing career
Cumbicus was born in Loja, but made his senior debut with LDU Quito in 1999. He moved to hometown side LDU Loja in the middle of 2004, and established himself as a starter for the club.

Cumbicus joined Aucas for the 2008 season, but returned to Liga de Loja in 2009. He struggled with injuries in the 2013 and 2014 campaigns, being also an interim assistant manager in the 2013 campaign.

Cumbicus retitred from football on 18 December 2014, aged 34.

Managerial career
Shortly after retiring, Cumbicus was named Julio César Toresani's assistant at his last club LDU Loja. In June 2015, he was named manager after Toresani resigned.

Cumbicus left Liga de Loja in late 2017, and was appointed in charge of Mushuc Runa for the 2018 season. He won the 2018 Serie B with the club, but was sacked on 28 May 2019.

Cumbicus agreed to a deal with Pelileo to become their manager for the 2020 campaign, but the club withdrew from the second division due to economic problems caused by the COVID-19 pandemic. He was named at the helm of Olmedo on 18 June 2020, and helped the club to narrowly avoid relegation.

Cumbicus left Olmedo as his contract expired, and returned to Mushuc Runa on 24 December 2020. On 16 November 2022, it was announced that he was leaving the club, but he agreed to a new contract for the 2023 season on 15 December.

Honours

Player
LDU Quito
Ecuadorian Serie A: 1999

Manager
Mushuc Runa
Ecuadorian Serie B: 2018

References

External links
 

1980 births
Living people
People from Loja, Ecuador
Ecuadorian footballers
Association football defenders
L.D.U. Quito footballers
L.D.U. Loja footballers
S.D. Aucas footballers
Ecuadorian football managers
C.D. Olmedo managers
Ecuadorian Serie A players
L.D.U. Loja managers
Mushuc Runa S.C. managers